Arthur Braverman is an American author and translator, primarily translating from Japanese to English. A Zen Buddhist practitioner, Braverman lived in Japan for seven years and studied at Antai-ji temple in 1969 training under Kosho Uchiyama. In 1978 he returned to the United States and studied classical Japanese at Columbia University. He lives in Ojai, CA with his wife.

Works 
 Living and Dying in Zazen: Five Zen Masters of Modern Japan
 Dharma Brothers: Kodo and Tokujoo, An historical novel based on the lives of two Zen masters, Kodo Sawaki and Kozan Tokujoo Kato.
 Bronx Park:  A Pelham Parkway Tale, a work of fiction set in the 1950s/1960s centered around friendship in the Bronx.

Translations
 Mud and Water: The Collected Teachings of Zen Master Bassui
 Warrior of Zen: The Diamond-Hard Wisdom Mind of Suzuki Shosan
 A Quiet Room: The Poetry of Zen Master Jakushitsu

References

Living people
American spiritual writers
American translators
Buddhist translators
Zen Buddhism writers
Japanese–English translators
American Zen Buddhists
1942 births